The men's 200 metres at the 2019 World Para Athletics Championships was held in Dubai 7–15 November.

Medalists

Events listed in pink were contested but no medals were awarded.

See also
List of IPC world records in athletics

References

200 metres
2019 in men's athletics
200 metres at the World Para Athletics Championships